Lemuel Herbert Murlin (November 16, 1861 – June 20, 1935), was the third president of Boston University.

Biography
He was born on November 16, 1861, in Neptune, Ohio to Orlando Murlin and Esther Hankins.

He became president of Baker University in Kansas in 1893. He was named the third president of Boston University in 1911.

In 1924 he became the president of DePauw University and served until 1928 when he retired due to ill health, and was replaced by Garfield Bromley Oxnam.

He died on June 20, 1935 in Wayland, Michigan, predeceasing by four years his wife, whom he had married in 1893.

References

External links
Lemuel Herbert Murlin at Depauw University

Presidents of DePauw University
Presidents of Boston University
Baker University people
1861 births
1935 deaths
People from Mercer County, Ohio